Fort Beauharnois was a French fort, serving as a fur trading post and Catholic mission, built on the shores of Lake Pepin, a wide section of the upper Mississippi River, in 1727. The location chosen was on lowlands and the fort was rebuilt in 1730 on higher ground. It was the site of the first Roman Catholic chapel in what is now Minnesota, which was dedicated to St. Michael the Archangel. The fort was named after the Governor of New France at the time, Charles de Beauharnois.

Eventually it was abandoned as the French sent most of their troops to the east to fight the British in the French and Indian War.

Today, an Ursuline convent and the Villa Maria Conference Center stand on the site of the old fort, in Florence Township of Goodhue County, in the Roman Catholic Archdiocese of Saint Paul and Minneapolis. The Minnesota Department of Transportation inventories a roadside historical marker of the presumed location of the fort along US 61/US 63

See also
 
 Pierre-Charles Le Sueur, one of the first French explorers to visit the upper Mississippi River in 1699
 Jacques Legardeur de Saint-Pierre, commanded the fort from 1734 to May 1737

References

External links 

Catholic Encyclopedia
Villa Maria Retreat and Conference Center

1727 establishments in New France
Buildings and structures in Goodhue County, Minnesota
Colonial forts in Minnesota
French-American culture in Minnesota
French forts in the United States